Claudia Acerenza Maríez (born 15 January 1966) is a retired Uruguayan sprinter who competed in the 200 and 400 metres. She represented her country at the 1988 Summer Olympics as well as two outdoor and two indoor World Championships. Her twin sister, Soledad Acerenza was also a sprinter.

She still holds national records on several sprinting distances.

International competitions

Personal bests
Outdoor
100 metres – 11.54 (Mexico City 1988) NR
200 metres – 23.78 (Mexico City 1988) NR
400 metres – 55.82 (Tokyo 1991)
Indoor
200 metres – 25.69 (Seville 1991)
400 metres – 56.57 (Seville 1991) NR

References

1966 births
Living people
Uruguayan female sprinters
Athletes (track and field) at the 1988 Summer Olympics
Athletes (track and field) at the 1987 Pan American Games
Athletes (track and field) at the 1991 Pan American Games
Olympic athletes of Uruguay
Pan American Games competitors for Uruguay
World Athletics Championships athletes for Uruguay
Twin sportspeople
Uruguayan twins
South American Games gold medalists for Uruguay
South American Games silver medalists for Uruguay
South American Games medalists in athletics
Competitors at the 1986 South American Games
Competitors at the 1990 South American Games
Olympic female sprinters